The Bredenbek is a tributary of the Bünzau in the north German state of Schleswig-Holstein. It rises west of Wasbek and discharges into the Bünzau west of Bargfeld.

See also
List of rivers of Schleswig-Holstein

Rivers of Schleswig-Holstein
Aukrug
Rivers of Germany